In the U.S. state of Texas, U.S. Route 82 (US 82) is a U.S. Highway that begins on the New Mexico border and heads east through West Texas and Lubbock to the Arkansas border at Texarkana.

Route description

New Mexico to Wichita Falls 
US 82 crosses into Texas from New Mexico at Texas Farm to Market Road 769, turning northeastward toward Plains, where it merges with US 380. US 82 is co-signed with US 380 from Plains to Brownfield, where it joins US 62, and US 380 leaves the route. US 82/62 continues northeastward toward Lubbock.
 
In Lubbock, US 82 and US 62 split, where US 82 has been upgraded to a full access freeway, named the Marsha Sharp Freeway, in honor of retired Texas Tech Lady Raiders basketball coach Marsha Sharp. On the east side of the city, US 82 travels as a surface street along Parkway Drive and it once again merges with US 62 (along with State Highway 114) where it continues eastward through Ralls, where US 62 makes a sharp turn to the north and leaves the route.  US 82 continues eastward across the level plains of the Llano Estacado to Crosbyton and then dips downward as it crosses the White River of Blanco Canyon, where the Texas Department of Transportation maintains the Silver Falls Rest Area with facilities and hiking trails.  After climbing out of Blanco Canyon, US 82 eventually exits the Llano Estacado and enters the rolling plains near Dickens.

US 82/SH 114 continues eastward as a co-signed route until Seymour, where it merges with U.S. Highways 183, 277 and 283, with US 183 and 283 leaving the route at Mabelle. US 82/277 continues eastward to Wichita Falls, merging with I-44 and US 287 just south of downtown at Mile marker 0.

Wichita Falls to Arkansas

US 82 leaves US 287 at Henrietta and continues east towards the small towns of Nocona (beginning as a four-lane divided highway), St. Jo and Muenster and crossing I-35 in Gainesville at a partial cloverleaf interchange (It has since been converted to a frontage road interchange in 2012.). The highway continues east towards Whitesboro and Sherman where it crosses US Highway 75 at a three-level diamond interchange (the portion through Sherman is called the Buck Owens Freeway in honor of the country music star, who was born in Sherman).  Prior to the 1990s, the two highways ran concurrently on the route of SH 56 before being rerouted northeast of Sherman on its present-day route. The highway continues east to Bells where US 82 cross US Route 69.

In Bonham, Texas, US 82 crosses SH 121  while the route runs parallel with SH 56 until Honey Grove where SH 56 ends. US 82 enters Paris at a diamond interchange where it runs concurrent with Loop 286 on the north side of the city as a Business Route runs through the center of the city before rejoining on the east side of Paris. At a diamond interchange on the north side of Paris, US 82/TX Loop 286 meets with US 271 where both highways run concurrent  on the northeast side of town before US 82 branches off at another diamond interchange on the east side of Paris. After passing around Clarksville and other smaller towns the highway is crossed by Interstate 30 east of New Boston at a partial cloverleaf and continues to run parallel to IH 30 into Arkansas through downtown Texarkana.

History
US 82 was first designated in Texas in 1939, traveling from Lubbock to Texarkana. The highway was extended from Lubbock to the New Mexico state line in 1963. Between 1974 and 1994, US 82 was re-routed from Whitesboro to Honey Grove; the old routing became SH 56. The highway was re-routed from Allendale Road to US 281/US 287 through Wichita Falls in 1998 with a bypass built around Holliday in 2005. US 82 was re-routed around Clarkesville in 2006, creating a concurrency with SH 37. The highway was re-routed south of Guthrie in 2007, with part of the former route becoming Spur 729.

Marsha Sharp Freeway
The Marsha Sharp Freeway, named for former Texas Tech Lady Raiders basketball coach Marsha Sharp, was built along US 82 in Lubbock, with construction officially beginning in May 2003, with development going back to the 1980s. In 1998, funding was first received. The five-phase project was scheduled to be completed in 2015. 

Phase 2 of the project was scheduled to be completed in December 2008 at a cost of $140 million. It involved construction of the freeway from Salem Avenue to Avenue L and erecting interchanges at 19th Street, Quaker Avenue, Fourth Street, and Avenue Q in Lubbock. Currently construction on the freeway has started from Milwaukee Ave. to Upland Ave. and on the intersection of Spur 327 and U.S. 62/82.

The section of freeway between West Loop 289 and Avenue L was widened from four lanes to six lanes between March 6, 2017 and March 5, 2018, officially marking the end of the freeway's construction.

Future
TxDOT began upgrading U.S. 82 in Grayson and Fannin County in 2013.  The four-lane divided highway upgrade between Sherman and Bonham was completed in 2015.  TxDOT plans to continue this upgrade to the Fannin and Lamar County line by 2020.  Long term planning calls for U.S. 82 to be a four-lane divided highway system the entire length between Wichita Falls and Texarkana as a potential alternate route through north Texas in order to bypass the overcrowded Dallas/Fort Worth Metroplex.

It is being upgraded to a 4 lane divided highway west of Nocona, and a partial bypass is planned to run south of Gainesville.

Major intersections

References 

82
Transportation in Bowie County, Texas
Transportation in Red River County, Texas
Transportation in Lamar County, Texas
Transportation in Fannin County, Texas
Transportation in Grayson County, Texas
Transportation in Cooke County, Texas
Transportation in Montague County, Texas
Transportation in Clay County, Texas
Transportation in Wichita County, Texas
Transportation in Archer County, Texas
Transportation in Baylor County, Texas
Transportation in Knox County, Texas
Transportation in King County, Texas
Transportation in Dickens County, Texas
Transportation in Crosby County, Texas
Transportation in Lubbock County, Texas
Transportation in Hockley County, Texas
Transportation in Terry County, Texas
Transportation in Yoakum County, Texas
Transportation in Lubbock, Texas
 Texas